Rodrigo Filipe Carreiro Lima (born 2 March 1999) is a Cape Verdean professional footballer who plays as a midfielder for Norwegian club Florø.

Club career
Lima started his senior career with Braga B, before moving to Torreense. On 1 August 2021, he signed for Norwegian Second Division club Florø.

International career
Lima was born in Portugal and is of Cape Verdean descent through his parents. Lima made his debut in a 0–0 (4–3) penalty shootout win over Andorra on 3 June 2018.

References

External links
 
 FPF Profile

1999 births
Living people
People from the Azores
Cape Verdean footballers
Cape Verde international footballers
Portuguese footballers
Portuguese people of Cape Verdean descent
CU Micaelense players
S.C. Braga players
S.C. Braga B players
S.C.U. Torreense players
Liga Portugal 2 players
Campeonato de Portugal (league) players
Florø SK players
Norwegian Second Division players
Portuguese expatriate footballers
Cape Verdean expatriate footballers
Expatriate footballers in Norway
Portuguese expatriate sportspeople in Norway
Cape Verdean expatriate sportspeople in Norway
Association football midfielders